Bogdan Gabriel Melinte (born 11 September 1998) is a Romanian professional footballer who plays as a forward for Liga III side Dante Botoșani, on loan from FC Botoșani.

References

External links
 
 Bogdan Melinte at frf-ajf.ro

1998 births
Living people
Sportspeople from Botoșani
Romanian footballers
Association football forwards
Liga I players
FC Botoșani players
Liga III players
CS Minaur Baia Mare (football) players
21st-century Romanian people